Alvin Wayland Shepard (August 21, 1865 – January 13, 1951) was an American football coach and player, and later a school principal. He served as the head coach at the University of Kansas from 1892 to 1893, compiling a record of 9–6. Shepard played college football at Cornell University from 1889 through 1891. He graduated from Cornell in 1891 with a Bachelor of Science degree and left for the University of Kansas the following year to do postgraduate work. While at Kansas he was a player-coach in that he not only coached the team for two years, but he also played on the team as a right end. After his two-year stint as the head coach and a player at Kansas, Shepard received his M.S. in physics from the University of Kansas in 1893, and he returned to his native New York, where he married his wife, Josephine Rebecca Frost, on August 3, 1896. He was a school principal for many years in Buffalo, New York. Shepard died on January 13, 1951, at a hospital in St. Petersburg, Florida. He was survived by a son, Alvin Frost Shepard (February 3, 1904 – October, 1978), and two daughters, Rebecca Shepard (September 1, 1906 – May 2, 1989) and Margaret Shepard (September 18, 1910 – January 13, 2006).

Head coaching record

References

1865 births
1951 deaths
19th-century players of American football
American football ends
Cornell Big Red football players
Kansas Jayhawks football coaches
Kansas Jayhawks football players
People from Evans, New York
Sportspeople from Buffalo, New York
Players of American football from Buffalo, New York